Voiron is a commune (French municipality) in the ninth district of the Isère department in southeastern France. It is the capital of the canton of Voiron and has been part of the Grenoble-Alpes Métropole since 2010. Its roughly 20,000 inhabitants are named Voironnais in French.

Voiron, along with Chambéry and Grenoble, is a gateway city of the Chartreuse Mountains in the Auvergne-Rhône-Alpes region.

History 

Voiron had been a part of the County of Savoy in the Middle Ages. In the Treaty of Paris (1355) the count exchanged Voiron and the rest of the region between the rivers Rhône and Isère (watered by the Guiers Mort) for Faucigny and Gex from France.

17th and 18th centuries
In 1700, the capital of the Chartreuse massif and its surrounding area had about 1,200 inhabitants and more than a hundred of them worked in the processing of hemp.

Since the beginning of the century, production had been organized around the Voironnaise factory and canvases were marked to certify their origin. The city acquired a great reputation thanks to its paintings resulting from a secular know-how. The privileges granted by Louis XII disappeared during the French Revolution. However, the production of canvas continued, and their reputation allowed Voiron to maintain this activity under the First Empire due in large part to purchases by the army.

19th century

The nineteenth century saw the decline of the era of canvas in Voiron because of the scarcity of linen and cotton, and because of the disappearance of the sailing navy which had been a large consumer of canvasses. Voiron came to be known for its fine silks, sought after by European royalties. Voiron then benefited from a female workforce, housed at the factory and often poorly paid. 
Voiron also gained religious influence marked by the 1876 erection of the Saint-Bruno church of neo-Gothic style by a first magistrate. A statue representing the Virgin Mary and the infant Jesus, a tribute to Notre-Dame-de-France Puy-en-Velay, was also erected.

20th century
The company Skis Rossignol was founded in 1907 by Abel Rossignol. Entire families of Voiron, along with Italian immigrants who arrived en masse at the beginning of the century, worked in these factories. On the eve of the First World War, the silk-weaving business used nearly 3,000 looms. At the same time, the rise of paper mills on the banks of the Morge, the river crossing the small town, attracted workers to the city. The company Radiall was founded as well and the population of Voiron grew past 15,000.

21st century
Voiron remains a significant economic and administrative center of the department of Isère. Voiron has sought to keep its independence from its much larger neighbor, the Grenoble conurbation. Voiron survived a difficult conversion after the departure of companies Rossignol and Johnson & Johnson. Pays Voironnais is working to attract new jobs aimed at limiting the dormitory phenomenon already affecting the suburbs of Voiron. However, because of the urban sprawl between Voreppe and Voiron, this town has been considered by the National Institute of Statistics and Economic Studies (INSEE) as belonging to the Grenoble-Alpes Métropole since 2010.

Geography 

Population

Sights 
The church of St Bruno was built between 1864 and 1873 at the expense of the monks of the Grande Chartreuse.

The distillery Chartreuse Cellars is a popular tourist destination. It is the longest liqueur cellar in the world. The cellar is open year-round with English guided tours available during June, July, and August.

Economy 
Voiron is a manufacturing town, and it contains numerous factories. Companies include: Rossignol (skis), Radiall Connections, Antésite (a liquorice-flavored drink), Chartreuse liquor cellars, Bonnat Chocolatier (since 1884), and Allaman (manufacturing and transporting of petrol tanks).

Education 
 Secondary (high school) 
 Lycée Édouard Herriot
 Lycée Ferdinand Buisson
 Lycée agricole La Martelière

Notable people
Dantès Dailiang (born 1978), singer-songwriter
Christophe Bouchut (born 1966), race driver, 24 Hours of Le Mans winner
Mélina Robert-Michon (born 1979), discus thrower
Fabien Centonze (born 1996), footballer

Twin towns – sister cities

Voiron is twinned with:
 Bassano del Grappa, Italy
 Droitwich Spa, England, United Kingdom
 Herford, Germany
 Šibenik, Croatia

See also
 SO Voiron – rugby union team

References

External links
Official site 

Communes of Isère
Dauphiné
Isère communes articles needing translation from French Wikipedia